Cheshmeh Inaq (also Romanized as Cheshmeh Īnāq and Cheshmeh-ye Eynāq; also known as Bardneshāndeh Cheshmeh-ye ‘Ayneān, Bar Neshāndeh, and Rūstā-ye Shahīd Jahāngīr-e Bāqerī) is a village in Tolbozan Rural District, Golgir District, Masjed Soleyman County, Khuzestan Province, Iran. At the 2006 census, its population was 36, in 8 families.

References 

Populated places in Masjed Soleyman County